Crescent is an unincorporated community in Spartanburg County, in the U.S. state of South Carolina.

History
A post office called Crescent was established in 1898, and remained in operation until 1933. The community was named for a crescent meander on the nearby Enoree River.

References

Unincorporated communities in Spartanburg County, South Carolina
Unincorporated communities in South Carolina